The Review of Religious Research is a quarterly journal that reviews the various methods, findings and uses of religious research. It contains a variety of articles, book reviews and reports on research projects. It is published by the Religious Research Association and was founded in 1959. According to the Journal Citation Reports, the journal has a 2018 impact factor of 0.981, ranking it 100 out of 148 journals in the category "Sociology" (5-year impact factor was 0.616 in 2015).

References

External links
 Official webpage
 Archives at JSTOR

1959 establishments in the United States
English-language journals
Protestant studies journals
Publications established in 1959